Shari's Cafe & Pies, originally known as Shari's Restaurants, is a chain of family dining restaurants in the western United States. Restaurants are open 365 days a year, many (but not all) are also open 24 hours. The franchise's original restaurant was opened in Hermiston, Oregon in 1978. In mid-2017, the company was operating 95 locations in the states of California, Idaho, Nebraska, Oregon, Washington, and Wyoming, just one fewer than in the year 2000. As of March 2023, there are 84 locations. Shari's features a distinctive hexagonal building design for most of its restaurant locations. Its corporate offices are located in the Progress area of Beaverton, Oregon.

History

Shari's began in Hermiston, Oregon in 1978 with Ron and Sharon Bergquist as proprietors. The two ran the company for seven years. By 1999, Shari's was the ninth-largest family restaurant chain in the United States based on total sales, and sixth in growth.

In March 1999, the chain was acquired by Fairmont Capital Inc. for $60 million. At that time Shari's operated 96 locations in seven states with 4,000 employees and $128 million in annual revenue. They were still the ninth largest family chain in 2003.

Shari's lost a gender discrimination lawsuit in April 2005 and was ordered to pay $122,225 in damages. In December 2005, the company was purchased by New York private investment firm Circle Peak Capital.

President Larry Curtis retired in July 2008 after 24 years with Shari's and was succeeded by Bruce MacDiarmid. In 2009, Shari's Restaurants took ownership of a number of northern California Baker's Square restaurants and converted them to operate under Shari's name. Since approximately the middle of 2011–2012, the chain has updated its logo and bills itself on signs and in media as "Shari's Cafe & Pies."

Shari's also had several restaurants in Colorado, Utah, and Arizona a long time ago. The restaurant company decided to permanently close all of its locations within those three states sometime between the very late 1990s and early 2000s due to poor management. The chain is currently operated by Shari's Management Corporation in Beaverton. Most, but not all locations are open 24 hours a day, with a focus on specialty pies. Samuel Borgese was named CEO in September 2017, replacing MacDiarmid.

In September 2018, it was announced that Shari's Cafe & Pies had taken over Carrows and Coco's Bakery.

Restaurant design

Shari's restaurants are notable for their patented hexagonal design.  The Bergquists originally sought to sell their patented idea to another company, but when they were unable to find a restaurant company willing to buy they started their own chain in Hermiston.  Most Shari's restaurants are built to this design; it places the kitchen in the center of the restaurant, providing easy access for the waiting staff to serve customers, and increases the number of tables next to a window.

Historically, upon entering a Shari's restaurant, the dining area was divided by half, with one half on either side of the entrance.  One side would allow smoking and the other would be non-smoking. Today the restaurants are non-smoking; however some Shari's restaurants have opened up video lottery rooms (some of which allow smoking) which occupy a portion of the former dining room and are walled off.

See also
 List of casual dining restaurant chains
 List of diners
 List of restaurant chains in the United States
 Cuisine of the United States

References

External links
 
 

1978 establishments in Oregon
Companies based in Beaverton, Oregon
Food and drink companies based in Oregon
Privately held companies based in Oregon
Regional restaurant chains in the United States
Restaurants established in 1978
Restaurants in Oregon